Paul de la Cuesta Esnal (born 28 November 1988) is an alpine skier from Spain.  He competed for Spain at the 2010 Winter Olympics.

Olympic results

References

External links

1988 births
Living people
Spanish male alpine skiers
Olympic alpine skiers of Spain
Alpine skiers at the 2010 Winter Olympics
Alpine skiers at the 2014 Winter Olympics
21st-century Spanish people